Gold Cross or Golden Cross may refer to:

Awards
 Army Gold Cross, British Army award of the Napoleonic wars
 German awards:
 German Cross in Gold, a Nazi Germany military award
 Cross of Honor of the German Mother, a Nazi Germany civilian award
 Spanish Cross in Gold, a Nazi Germany award given to certain Germans who participated in the Spanish Civil War
One of the grades of the Badge of Honour of the Armed Forces (Bundeswehr), a German Federal Republic award
 One of the classes of the Greek Order of the Redeemer
Gold Cross (Philippines), a decoration of the Armed Forces of the Philippines
 Polish awards:
 Cross of Merit (Poland) (Golden Cross of Merit), a Polish award instituted in 1923
 Cross of Merit with Swords (Gold Cross of Merit with Swords), a Polish military award instituted in 1942

Places in the United Kingdom
 Golden Cross, Herstmonceux, East Sussex, a hamlet in the Pevensey Levels
 Golden Cross, East Sussex, a small village in Chiddingly parish
 Monkland and Stretford, Herefordshire, an electoral ward and crossroads

Buildings in the United Kingdom 
 Golden Cross, Cardiff, a public house
 Golden Cross, Coventry, a public house
 Golden Cross, Oxford, a shopping arcade
 Golden Cross, Shrewsbury, a public house

Other uses
Golden cross in technical analysis of financial securities, a particular, considered bullish, signal
Golden Cross mine, New Zealand
Golden Cross (TV series), 2014 South Korean TV series
Cicindela aurofasciata, a species of tiger beetle, sometimes called the 'gold cross'

See also
Cross of Gold speech